Masini may refer to:

People
 Alfred Masini (1930–2010), American television producer
Barbara Masini (born 1974), Italian politician
 Donna Masini, American poet and novelist 
 Francesco Masini (1894–1964), Maltese lawyer and politician
 Frank Masini (born 1944), Italian-American serial killer
 Galliano Masini (1896–1986), Italian operatic tenor
 Gerardo Masini, (born 1982), Argentine footballer
 Girolamo Masini (1840–1885), Italian sculptor
 Marco Masini (born 1964), Italian singer-songwriter
 Nicola Masini, (born 1965), Italian scientist
 Simone Masini (born 1984) Italian footballer
 Tobia Masini (born 1976), Italian auto racing driver

Places
 Masini, Iran

See also 

 Massini

Surnames of Italian origin